George Edward Grigor (September 3, 1916 — October 7, 1979) was a Scottish-born Canadian ice hockey centre who played 2 games in the National Hockey League for the Chicago Black Hawks during the 1943–44 season. The rest of his career, which lasted from 1936 to 1948, was mainly spent in senior leagues.

Biography
Born in Edinburgh, Scotland, but grew up in Toronto, Ontario and played junior with the local Young Rangers. In his final year of junior, 1935–36, he also played in the Toronto Mercantile Hockey League with the Toronto Dominions. He spent the next three years with a variety of commercial and OHA Senior A clubs before joining the Baltimore Orioles of the Eastern Amateur Hockey League in 1939. He recorded consecutive 20-goal seasons with Baltimore before returning to Toronto. Between 1941 and 1950, he continued to play for teams in the Mercantile league, the Toronto Hockey League's commercial division, and the OHA Senior A league.

On January 6, 1944, while a member of Stafford Industries of the Toronto Mercantile Hockey League, he made his NHL debut with the Chicago Black Hawks, scoring their only goal in a 6–1 loss to the Toronto Maple Leafs at Maple Leaf Gardens. His only other NHL appearance was a few weeks later, on January 28, when the Black Hawks again visited Toronto. The Globe and Mail reported that the Black Hawks would have liked to sign Grigor, but his job in a war plant kept him in Toronto.

He died at Toronto in 1979.

Career statistics

Regular season and playoffs

See also
List of National Hockey League players from the United Kingdom

References

External links

Article referring to the "late George Grigor"

1916 births
1979 deaths
Baltimore Orioles (ice hockey) players
Canadian ice hockey centres
Chicago Blackhawks players
Ontario Hockey Association Senior A League (1890–1979) players
Ice hockey people from Toronto
Sportspeople from Edinburgh
Toronto Young Rangers players